Austria has submitted films for the Academy Award for Best International Feature Film since 1961. The award is handed out annually by the United States Academy of Motion Picture Arts and Sciences to a feature-length motion picture produced outside the United States that contains primarily non-English dialogue. It was not created until the 1956 Academy Awards, in which a competitive Academy Award of Merit, known as the Best Foreign Language Film Award, was created for non-English speaking films, and has been given annually since.

Four Austrian films have been nominated for the Academy Award for Best Foreign Language Film: Wolfgang Glück's '38 - Vienna Before the Fall at the 59th Academy Awards, Stefan Ruzowitzky's The Counterfeiters at the 80th Academy Awards, Gotz Spielmann's Revanche at the 81st Academy Awards, and Michael Haneke's Amour at the 85th Academy Awards. Ruzowitzky's The Counterfeiters and Haneke's Amour won the award.

Submissions
The Academy of Motion Picture Arts and Sciences has invited the film industries of various countries to submit their best film for the Academy Award for Best Foreign Language Film since 1956. The Foreign Language Film Award Committee oversees the process and reviews all the submitted films. Following this, they vote via secret ballot to determine the five nominees for the award. Below is a list of the films that have been submitted by Austria for review by the Academy for the award by year and the respective Academy Awards ceremony.

Most Austrian submissions were primarily in German. Austria's 2001 and 2005 submissions were filmed in French, and dubbed into German when they were submitted for consideration to the Academy, while a subsequent rule change allowed them to send a third film in French in 2012. Austria's 2009 submission was mostly in Persian and Turkish and their 2010 submission was in Italian.

See also
List of Academy Award winners and nominees for Best Foreign Language Film
List of Academy Award-winning foreign language films
Cinema of Austria

Notes

References

External links
The Official Academy Awards Database
The Motion Picture Credits Database
IMDb Academy Awards Page

Austria
Academy